Ites is a genus of longhorn beetles of the subfamily Lamiinae, containing the following species:

 Ites chaparensis Tippmann, 1960
 Ites colasi Lepesme, 1943
 Ites plagiatus Waterhouse, 1880

References

Hemilophini